Visionic is a network management computer system and network monitoring software application produced by Intorel.
In 2002, Intorel launched the first version of later to become its flagship product - Visionic.

References

Intorel...Visionic 5 Is Visionary In A Centralized System, satnews.com,  January 24, 2013
A Case In Point: M&C in Myanmar - Intorel’s Visionic M&C system: SatMagazine, satmagazine.com,  November 6, 2012.
Intorel has rolled out Visionic version 4.2, a monitoring and control solution for the broadcast and satellite industry, satellitetoday.com,  February 20, 2009.
 CASE STUDY - The COTS Benefit — Intorel's Visionic : SatMagazine, satmagazine.com,  September 7, 2008.
 Intorel announces new Visionic Updates with launch of Version 3.55 satellite monitoring and control system by Duncan Burford,  September 17, 2007.
 Intorel launches new version of pioneering Visionic 'click and drag' monitoring and control system for broadcasters by Tom Bandenburg, creativemac.digitalmedianet.com,  April 12, 2007.
 Pals uses the Visionic Universal M&C system developed by Intorel (www.intorel.com ), pals.com, November 14, 2006.
 The whole system is controlled by the Visionic monitoring & control system, hiltron-communications.com.com.

External links
 Intorel homepage

System administration
Computer network analysis
Network performance